Johann Sebastian Bach composed the church cantata  (Who only lets dear God rule), 93 in Leipzig for the fifth Sunday after Trinity and first performed it on 9 July 1724. He based the chorale cantata on the hymn of the same title by Georg Neumark (1657). It is part of his chorale cantata cycle.

History 

Bach composed the chorale cantata in 1724 as part of his second annual cycle for the Fifth Sunday after Trinity. Only continuo parts of the first four movements survived of the first performance. The manuscripts of the complete music date from another performance around 1732/1733, therefore it is unknown if the cantata had the same structure from the beginning.

The prescribed readings for the Sunday were from the First Epistle of Peter, "Sanctify the Lord God in your hearts", and from the Gospel of Luke, Peter's great catch of fish (. The chorale is connected in general to the prescribed readings. Specific reference to the Gospel appears in the recitative addition of movement 5. The words of the chorale remain unchanged in movements 1, 4 and 7 in a symmetric arrangement. The changes in the other movements are the work of an unknown poet. In movements 2 and 5 he kept the original words but expanded them by recitatives, in movements 3 and 6 he transformed the ideas of the chorale to arias.

This chorale cantata is not to be confused with the chorale prelude of the same name, BWV 642. That chorale prelude, which is in the Orgelbüchlein collection, was also based upon the hymn by Georg Neumark.

Scoring and structure 

The cantata in seven movements is scored for four soloists—soprano, alto, tenor and bass—a four-part choir, two oboes, two violins, viola, viola da gamba and basso continuo.

 Chorus: 
 Recitative (+ chorale, bass): 
 Aria (tenor): 
 Duet aria (soprano, alto): 
 Recitative (+ chorale, tenor): 
 Aria (soprano): 
 Chorale:

Music 

In the central duet violins and violas play the melody of the chorale. Bach later arranged this movement for organ as one of the Schübler Chorales, BWV 647.

The opening chorus is a concerto of three elements: the orchestra, dominated by the two oboes, playing an introduction and ritornellos, the cantus firmus in the soprano, and the other voices which start each of the three sections and keep singing on the long final notes of the cantus firmus, soprano and alto opening the first section, tenor and bass the second, all four voices the last section.

Movements 2 and 5 are composed in the same fashion, alternating the slightly ornamented lines of the chorale with recitative.

In the first aria Bach uses a motive which turns the beginning of the chorale melody to major, to express trust in God. The cantata concludes with a four-part setting of the chorale.

Recordings 
 J. S. Bach: Cantatas BWV 93 & BWV 131, Hans Thamm, Windsbacher Knabenchor, Consortium Musicum, Teresa Żylis-Gara, Ingeborg Ruß, Peter Schreier, Franz Crass, EMI Electrola 1966
 Bach Cantatas Vol. 3 – Ascension Day, Whitsun, Trinity, Karl Richter, Münchener Bach-Chor, Münchener Bach-Orchester, Edith Mathis, Anna Reynolds, Peter Schreier, Dietrich Fischer-Dieskau, Archiv Produktion 1975
 Die Bach Kantate Vol. 14, Helmuth Rilling, Gächinger Kantorei, Bach-Collegium Stuttgart, Arleen Augér, Ann Murray, Adalbert Kraus, Walter Heldwein, Hänssler 1979
 J. S. Bach: Das Kantatenwerk – Sacred Cantatas Vol. 5, Nikolaus Harnoncourt, Tölzer Knabenchor, Concentus Musicus Wien, soloist of the Tölzer Knabenchor, Paul Esswood, Kurt Equiluz, Ruud van der Meer, Teldec 1979
 J. S. Bach: Kantaten O ewiges Feuer, o Ursprung der Liebe BWV 34; Wer nur den lieben Gott läßt walten BWV 93; Was Gott tut, das ist wohlgetan BWV 100, Karl-Friedrich Beringer, Windsbacher Knabenchor, Consortium Musicum, Susanne Winter, Rebecca Martin, Markus Schäfer, Sebastian Bluth, Rondeau Production 1999
 J. S. Bach: Complete Cantatas Vol. 21, Ton Koopman, Amsterdam Baroque Orchestra & Choir, Deborah York, Franziska Gottwald, Paul Agnew, Klaus Mertens, Antoine Marchand 2000
 J. S. Bach: Cantatas for the Complete Liturgical Year Vol. 5, Sigiswald Kuijken, La Petite Bande, Siri Thornhill, Petra Noskaiová, Christoph Genz, Jan van der Crabben, Accent 2005

References

External links 

 
 Wer nur den lieben Gott lässt walten BWV 93; BC A 104 / Chorale cantata (5th Sunday after Trinity) Bach Digital
 Cantata BWV 93 Wer nur den lieben Gott läßt walten history, scoring, sources for text and music, translations to various languages, discography, discussion, Bach Cantatas Website
 BWV 93 Wer nur den lieben Gott lässt walten English translation, University of Vermont
 BWV 93 Wer nur den lieben Gott lässt walten text, scoring, University of Alberta
 
 Luke Dahn: BWV 93.7 bach-chorales.com

Church cantatas by Johann Sebastian Bach
1724 compositions
Chorale cantatas